is a Japanese drama.

Synopsis

Azusa Shiratori (Yui Ichikawa) is the only child of the president of "Shiratori Girls Pro Wrestling" - a small female professional wrestling league. After the death of her father from an illness, Azusa struggles to keep the wrestling league afloat. The company is near bankruptcy with large debts. On the day of a wrestling match, the referee leaves behind a brief note stating that he quit. He also disappears without a trace. Azusa is now in a serious jam, needing a replacement referee.
Azusa then stumbles across a Korean guy (Lee Hong-gi) she meets on the street. She persuades the man to become a referee for just one day. Unbeknown to Azusa, the man is also a popular star in South Korea.
In order to keep "Shiratori Girls Pro Wrestling" afloat, they then join forces to go up against a rival pro-wrestling organization.

Cast

Yui Ichikawa as Shiratori Azusa
Lee Hong-gi as Yoo Ji Ho
Kensei Mikami as Gohara Koji
Hikaru Yamamoto as Sudo Tsukasa
Saki Akai as Himawari
Vanessa Aya as Uonuma Mai
Hikaru Shida as Hoshi Kaoru
Keiko Koike as Skull Kyoko
Nobuyoshi Kuwano as Kurogane Nobuhiro
Fukumi Kuroda as Lee Soon Ja

References

Japanese drama television series
2011 Japanese television series debuts
2011 Japanese television series endings